Euxesta hyalipennis is a species of ulidiid or picture-winged fly in the genus Euxesta of the family Ulidiidae.

References

hyalipennis
Insects described in 1932